HMS Deptford was a 50-gun fourth-rate ship of the line of the Royal Navy, launched at Woolwich Dockyard in 1687.

She underwent her first rebuild at Woolwich in 1700 as a fourth rate of between 46 and 54 guns. Her second rebuild took place at Portsmouth Dockyard, where she was reconstructed as a 50-gun fourth rate to the 1706 Establishment and relaunched on 19 June 1719.

She was captained in 1710 by Sir Tancred Robinson.

Deptford was sold out of the navy c.1725.

Notes

References

 

Ships of the line of the Royal Navy
1680s ships